Alin Răzvan Fică (born 14 June 2001) is a Romanian professional footballer who plays as a midfielder for Liga I club CFR Cluj.

Honours

Club
CFR Cluj
Liga I: 2019–20, 2021–22

References

External links
 
 
 

2001 births
Living people
People from Caracal, Romania
Romanian footballers
Association football midfielders
Liga I players
CFR Cluj players
Liga II players
FC Rapid București players
CS Academica Recea players
Liga III players